Lisa O'Keefe (born 30 August 1973) is an Australian taekwondo practitioner, born in Warrnambool. She competed at the 2000 Summer Olympics in Sydney. She won a bronze medal in lightweight at the 1999 World Taekwondo Championships, after being defeated by Cho Hyang-mi in the semifinal.

References

External links

1973 births
Living people
Australian female taekwondo practitioners
Olympic taekwondo practitioners of Australia
Taekwondo practitioners at the 2000 Summer Olympics
World Taekwondo Championships medalists
21st-century Australian women